The 101st Regiment, Indiana Volunteer Infantry was an infantry regiment that served in the Union Army during the American Civil War. It fought in several major campaigns and battles in the Western Theater, including the Atlanta Campaign and the Carolinas Campaign. In 1862, the regiment was formed under the Army of the Ohio. From 1863 to 1865, attached to the Army of the Cumberland, XIV Army Corps.

Overview 
Organized at Wabash, Ind., and mustered in September 7, 1862. Left State for Covington, Ky., September 7, and duty there till September 23. Moved to Louisville, Ky., September 23. Attached to 33rd Brigade, 10th Division, Army of the Ohio, September, 1862. 33rd Brigade, 10th Division, 1st Corps, Army of the Ohio, to November, 1862. 2nd Brigade, 5th Division (Centre), 14th Army Corps, Army of the Cumberland, to January, 1863. 2nd Brigade, 5th Division, 14th Army Corps, Army of the Cumberland, to June, 1863. 2nd Brigade, 4th Division, 14th Army Corps, to October, 1863. 2nd Brigade, 3rd Division, 14th Army Corps, to June, 1865. 1st Brigade, 3rd Division, 14th Army Corps, to June, 1865.

Service 
Mustered in September 7, 1862
Defense of Cincinnati
Tullahoma Campaign (Battle of Hoover's Gap)
Battle of Chickamauga
Battle of Missionary Ridge
Atlanta Campaign
Battle of Rocky Face Ridge
Battle of Resaca
Battle of New Hope Church
Battle of Dallas
Battle of Marietta
Battle of Kennesaw Mountain
Battle of Atlanta
Battle of Jonesborough
Battle of Lovejoy's Station
Sherman's March to the Sea
Siege of Savannah - Savannah, Georgia
Carolinas Campaign
Battle of Bentonville
Grand Review of the Armies in Washington, D.C.
Mustered out June 24, 1865

See also
 List of Indiana Civil War regiments

References 

 Dyer, Frederick H. (1959). A Compendium of the War of the Rebellion. New York and London. Thomas Yoseloff, Publisher. 
 https://www.nps.gov/civilwar/search-battle-units-detail.htm?battleUnitCode=UIN0101RI

Units and formations of the Union Army from Indiana
Military units and formations established in 1862
Military units and formations disestablished in 1865
1862 establishments in Indiana